Kim Cotton (born 24 February 1978) is a New Zealand cricket umpire. In August 2018, she stood in matches in the 2018–19 ICC World Twenty20 East Asia-Pacific Qualifier tournament, and the following month was added to the Development Panel of ICC Umpires.

In October 2018, she was named as one of the twelve on-field umpires for the 2018 ICC Women's World Twenty20. In May 2019, the International Cricket Council (ICC) named her as one of the eight women on the ICC Development Panel of Umpires. In August 2019, she was named as one of the umpires to officiate in matches during the 2019 ICC Women's World Twenty20 Qualifier tournament in Scotland.

In February 2020, the ICC named her as one of the umpires to officiate in matches during the 2020 ICC Women's T20 World Cup in Australia. Cotton was also named as one of the two on-field umpires for the final of the tournament. In February 2022, she was named as one of the on-field umpires for the 2022 Women's Cricket World Cup in New Zealand. On 1 April 2022, the ICC named Cotton as one of the on-field umpires for the final of the tournament.

References

External links
 

1978 births
Living people
New Zealand cricket umpires
Sportspeople from Auckland
Women cricket umpires